Robert Ridgely (December 24, 1931 – February 8, 1997) was an American actor, known for both on-camera roles and extensive voice-over work.

Biography
Ridgely was a native of Teaneck, New Jersey. Before becoming an actor, he worked as a cabaret entertainer.  

He served as a talk show host with Woody Woodbury. Ridgely appeared in commercials, including a classic McDonald's commercial, staged as a Broadway production number, where he sings "there is nothin' so clean – as my burger machine". He guest starred on TV series such as Sea Hunt and the Warner Bros. Television series Maverick, Lawman, and Surfside 6. He landed a regular role as Lieutenant Kimbro in the short-lived World War II Warner Bros./ABC series The Gallant Men. After the series was cancelled, he made guest appearances on shows, including Bonanza, WKRP in Cincinnati, Coach, Night Court, Wings and Designing Women. 

He appeared in various films, including two productions directed by Robert Altman early in his career, Nightmare in Chicago and Countdown. He also appeared in several Mel Brooks productions, including Blazing Saddles (1974), High Anxiety (1977), Life Stinks (1991) and Robin Hood: Men in Tights (1993). Ridgley starred in other films, including Something Wild (1986), Beverly Hills Cop II (1987), Philadelphia (1993) and Boogie Nights (1997). He put his strong voice to use in voice-over roles in movies like Down and Dirty Duck (1974) and television specials such as Thanksgiving in the Land of Oz (aka Dorothy in the Land of Oz) (1980). He did a great deal of voice work on animated series as well, including the titular heroes in Tarzan, Lord of the Jungle, The New Adventures of Flash Gordon, and Thundarr the Barbarian. From 1985 to 1996, Ridgely was one of ABC's main primetime promo announcers. He also voiced the Peculiar Purple Pieman in the 1980s Strawberry Shortcake specials, Rex Charger in The Centurions, General "Thunderbolt" Ross on The Incredible Hulk, Finch on Daisy-Head Mayzie, and Commander Chief in Dexter's Laboratory.

Ridgely died of cancer on February 8, 1997, at his home in the Toluca Lake neighborhood of Los Angeles.

Filmography

Film

References

External links

TV.com page for Robert Ridgely
New York Times movie page for Robert Ridgely
Movie stills of Robert Ridgely

1931 births
1997 deaths
American male film actors
American male television actors
American male voice actors
Deaths from cancer in California
Male actors from Los Angeles
Male actors from New Jersey
People from Teaneck, New Jersey
People from Toluca Lake, Los Angeles
20th-century American male actors